Abacá, binomial name Musa textilis, is a species of banana native to the Philippines, grown as a commercial crop in the Philippines, Ecuador, and Costa Rica. The plant, also known as Manila hemp, has great economic importance, being harvested for its fiber, also called Manila hemp, extracted from the leaf-stems. Abacá is also the traditional source of lustrous fiber hand-loomed into various indigenous textiles in the Philippines like t'nalak, as well as colonial-era sheer luxury fabrics known as nipís. They are also the source of fibers for sinamáy, a loosely woven stiff material used for textiles as well as in traditional Philippine millinery.

The fiber was originally used for making twines and ropes; now most is pulped and used in a variety of specialized paper products including tea bags, filter paper and banknotes. It is classified as a hard fiber, along with coir, henequin and sisal.

Description
The abacá plant is stoloniferous, meaning that the plant produces runners or shoots along the ground that then root at each segment. Cutting and transplanting rooted runners is the primary technique for creating new plants, since seed growth is substantially slower. The leaf stalks (petioles) are expanded at the base to form sheaths that are tightly wrapped together to form the pseudostem. There are from 12 to 25 leaves, dark green on the top and pale green on the underside, sometimes with large brown patches. They are oblong in shape with a deltoid base. They grow in succession. The petioles grow to at least  in length.

When the plant is mature, the flower stalk grows up inside the pseudostem. The leaf sheaths contain the valuable fiber. They are composed primarily of cellulose, lignin, and pectin.

Systematics
The abacá plant belongs to the banana family, Musaceae; it resembles the closely related wild seeded bananas, Musa acuminata and Musa balbisiana. Its scientific name is Musa textilis. Within the genus Musa, it is placed in section Callimusa (now including the former section Australimusa), members of which have a diploid chromosome number of 2n = 20.

Genetic Diversity 
The Philippines, especially the Bicol region in Luzon, has the most abaca genotypes and cultivars. Genetic analysis using simple sequence repeats (SSR) markers revealed that the Philippines' abaca germplasm is genetically diverse. Abaca genotypes in Luzon had higher genetic diversity than Visayas and Mindanao. Ninety-five (95) percent was attributed to molecular variance within the population, and only 5% of the molecular variance to variation among populations. Genetic analysis by Unweighted Pair Group Method with Arithmetic Mean (UPGMA) revealed several clusters irrespective of geographical origin.

History

Before synthetic textiles came into use, M. textilis was a major source of high quality fiber: soft, silky and fine. Ancestors of the modern abacá are thought to have originated from the eastern Philippines, where there is significant rainfall throughout the year. Wild varieties of abacá can still be found in the interior forests of the island province of Catanduanes, away from cultivated areas.

Today, Catanduanes has many other modern kinds of abacá which are more competitive. For many years, breeders from various research institutions have made the cultivated varieties of Catanduanes even more competitive in local and international markets. This results in the optimum production of the island which had a consistent highest production throughout the archipelago.

Europeans first came into contact with Abacá fibre when Ferdinand Magellan landed in the Philippines in 1521, as the natives were already cultivating it and utilizing it in bulk for textiles. Throughout the Spanish colonial era, it was referred to as "medriñaque" cloth. By 1897, the Philippines were exporting almost 100,000 tons of abacá, and it was one of the three biggest cash crops, along with tobacco and sugar. In fact, from 1850 through the end of the 19th century, sugar or abacá alternated with each other as the biggest export crop of the Philippines. This 19th-century trade was predominantly with the United States and the making of ropes was done mainly in New England, although in time rope-making shifted back to the Philippines.

Excluding the Philippines, abacá was first cultivated on a large scale in Sumatra in 1925 under the Dutch, who had observed its cultivation in the Philippines for cordage since the nineteenth century, followed up by plantings in Central America in 1929 sponsored by the U.S. Department of Agriculture. It also was transplanted into India and Guam. Commercial planting began in 1930 in British North Borneo; at the onset of World War II, the supply from the Philippines was eliminated by the Empire of Japan.

In the early 1900s, a train running from Danao to Argao would transport Philippine abacá from the plantations to Cebu City for export. The railway system was destroyed during World War II; the abaca continues to be transported to Cebu by road.

After the war, the U.S. Department of Agriculture started production in Panama, Costa Rica, Honduras, and Guatemala. Today, abacá is produced primarily in the Philippines and Ecuador. The Philippines produces between 85% and 95% of the world's abacá, and the production employs 1.5 million people. Production has declined because of virus diseases.

Cultivation
The plant is normally grown in well-drained loamy soil, using rhizomes planted at the start of the rainy season. In addition, new plants can be started by seeds. Growers harvest abacá fields every three to eight months after an initial growth period of 12–25 months. Harvesting is done by removing the leaf-stems after flowering but before fruit appears. The plant loses productivity between 15 and 40 years. The slopes of volcanoes provide a preferred growing environment. Harvesting generally includes several operations involving the leaf sheaths:
 tuxying (separation of primary and secondary sheath)
 stripping (getting the fibers)
 drying (usually following the tradition of sun-drying).

In Costa Rica, more modern harvest and drying techniques are being developed to accommodate the very high yields obtained there.

According to the Philippine Fiber Industry Development Authority, the Philippines provided 87.4% of the world's abacá in 2014, earning the Philippines US$111.33 million. The demand is still greater than the supply. The remainder came from Ecuador (12.5%) and Costa Rica (0.1%). The Bicol region in the Philippines produced 27,885 metric tons of abacá in 2014, the largest of any Philippine region.

The Philippine Rural Development Program (PRDP) and the Department of Agriculture reported that in 2009–2013, Bicol Region had 39% share of Philippine abacá production while overwhelming 92% comes from Catanduanes Island. Eastern Visayas, the second largest producer had 24% and the Davao Region, the third largest producer had 11% of the total production. Around 42 percent of the total abacá fiber shipments from the Philippines went to the United Kingdom in 2014, making it the top importer. Germany imported 37.1 percent abacá pulp from the Philippines, importing around 7,755 metric tons (MT). Sales of abacá cordage surged 20 percent in 2014 to a total of 5,093 MT from 4,240 MT, with the United States holding around 68 percent of the market.

Pathogens
Abacá is vulnerable to a number of pathogens, notably abaca bunchy top virus, abaca bract mosaic virus, and abaca mosaic virus.

Uses 

Due to its strength, it is a sought after product and is the strongest of the natural fibers. It is used by the paper industry for such specialty uses such as tea bags, banknotes and decorative papers. It can be used to make handcrafts such as hats, bags, carpets, clothing and furniture.

Abacá rope is very durable, flexible and resistant to salt water damage, allowing its use in hawsers, ship's lines and fishing nets. A  rope can require  to break. Abacá fiber was once used primarily for rope, but this application is now of minor significance. Lupis is the finest quality of abacá. Sinamay is woven chiefly from abacá.

Textiles

 
The inner fibers are used in the making of hats, including the "Manila hats," hammocks, matting, cordage, ropes, coarse twines, and types of canvas. Abacá cloth is found in museum collections around the world, like the Boston Museum of Fine Arts and the Textile Museum of Canada.

Philippine indigenous tribes still weave abacá-based textiles like t'nalak, made by the Tiboli tribe of South Cotabato, and dagmay, made by the Bagobo people.

Industrial textile production

Processing

Dyeing and weaving

See also
Piña
T'nalak
Malong
Tapis
Inabel
Batik
Yakan people
Fiber crop
International Year of Natural Fibres
Natural fiber
Manila hemp
Manila folder
 Domesticated plants and animals of Austronesia

Notes

Footnotes

References
 
 
 
 
 
 
 
 
 
 
 
 
 
 
 
Yllano, O. B., Diaz, M. G. Q., Lalusin, A. G., Laurena, A. C., & Tecson-Mendoza, E. M. (2020). Genetic Analyses of Abaca (Musa textilis Née) Germplasm from its Primary Center of Origin, the Philippines, Using Simple Sequence Repeat (SSR) Markers. Philippine Agricultural Scientist, 103(4).

External links

The World Book encyclopedia set, 1988.
See International Year of Natural Fibres 2009

 Abáca or Manila hemp - Historical notes
 Plants USDA
 abacá A comprehensive pamphlet about Philippine abacá presented 1915 Panama Pacific International Exposition held in San Francisco. Online publication uploaded in Filipiniana.net

Musa (genus)
Flora of the Philippines
Tagalog words and phrases
Fiber plants
Biodegradable materials
Philippine clothing
History of Asian clothing
Philippine handicrafts